The Defence School of Communications and Information Systems (DSCIS) is a Defence Training Establishment of the British Ministry of Defence. It was formed on 1 April 2004 and comprises a headquarters and The Royal Signals School at Blandford Camp, and No.1 Radio School at RAF Cosford, including the Aerial Erectors School at RAF Digby.

History 
The school was formed on 1 April 2004 as the Defence College of Communications and Information Systems to deliver coherent and cost effective training across defence. In 2012, it joined three other technical training colleges under a combined organisation, the Defence College of Technical Training, and reverted in title to being a Defence School.

Constituent elements 
The establishment comprises several affiliated schools.

Headquarters 
The DSCIS headquarters is at the British Army's Blandford Camp in Dorset. The school reports to the Defence College of Technical Training (DCTT) which, in turn, is part of the Royal Air Force's No. 22 Group.

DSCIS administers Blandford Camp, a  site home to ten other organisations, mostly CIS related, with a total staff of over 1,000. The camp includes 500 service family houses, accommodation for a further 2,000 single or unaccompanied personnel, and a wide range of social amenities.

11th (The Royal School of Signals) Signals Regiment  
The training element of the Royal Corps of Signals is the 11th (The Royal School of Signals) Signals Regiment. It is located at Blandford Camp alongside the school headquarters.

No. 1 Radio School 
The Royal Air Force's No. 1 Radio School is based at RAF Cosford in Shropshire. A satellite of the Radio School is the Aerial Erector School at RAF Digby in Lincolnshire.

Role and operations 

DSCIS's mission is: to train and educate information and communications engineers, technicians and operators in order to meet the requirements of Defence and needs of trainees now and into the future.

The school deliver a wide range of initial and advanced technical training in communications and information systems, and leadership training, to British servicemen and women and international defence students. Overall the School offers 180 different course types, from short equipment-specific courses to Bachelor degrees. It offers a key contribution to modern apprenticeships for the Royal Corps of Signals and the Royal Air Force's Trade Group 4, as well as delivering the academic foundation needed for registration with professional institutes.

DSCIS staff are a mix of military, civil service and contractors covering instructional, management and support functions. It delivers approximately 200,000 training days per year, to an average student population of 1,100.

External links

The Royal School of Signals
RAF Digby
Aerial Erector School

Educational institutions established in 2004
Information schools
Military academies of the United Kingdom
Military communications units and formations of the United Kingdom
Military training establishments of the United Kingdom
Telecommunication education
2004 establishments in the United Kingdom